Elijah Tana (born 28 February 1975) is a Zambian former professional footballer who played as a centre-back.

International career
Tana represented the Zambia national team at the African Cup of Nations in 2000 and 2006.

See also
List of men's footballers with 100 or more international caps

References

External links

1975 births
Living people
People from Luanshya
Association football defenders
Zambian footballers
Zambia international footballers
2000 African Cup of Nations players
2002 African Cup of Nations players
2006 Africa Cup of Nations players
UAE Pro League players
Nchanga Rangers F.C. players
Atlético Petróleos de Luanda players
Al Jazira Club players
Al-Merrikh SC players
Zambian expatriate footballers
Expatriate footballers in Angola
Expatriate footballers in the United Arab Emirates
Expatriate footballers in Sudan
FIFA Century Club
Zambia A' international footballers
2009 African Nations Championship players
Zambian expatriate sportspeople in the United Arab Emirates
Zambian expatriate sportspeople in Sudan
Zambian expatriate sportspeople in Angola